Yukota "Ko" Simpson (born November 9, 1983) is a former American football safety. He was drafted by the Buffalo Bills in the fourth round of the 2006 NFL Draft. He played college football at South Carolina.

He has also played for the Detroit Lions.

Early life
Simpson was born in Rock Hill, South Carolina and attended Castle Heights Middle School and Rock Hill High School where he helped lead the team to a Class AAAA State Championship playing on both offense and defense. He signed a letter of intent with South Carolina in 2003, but did not enroll until spring of 2004 under then head coach Lou Holtz.

College career
In his freshman season, Simpson recorded 50 solo tackles, 11 assists and six interceptions.  Against Georgia, in only his second collegiate game, he intercepted a David Greene pass and returned it 57 yards for a touchdown.  He was named SEC Defensive Player of the Week for his performance in the Gamecocks' win over Arkansas which included a fumble recovery returned 57 yards for a touchdown.  
His six interceptions led the Southeastern Conference and he was named Freshman of the Year in the SEC by the Associated Press, becoming the first South Carolina player to ever win the award.

As a sophomore, Simpson had 103 total tackles, two fumble returns and an interception.  He was consensus All-SEC and named a Football Writers Association All-American.

Professional career

Buffalo Bills
Simpson was drafted by the Buffalo Bills in the fourth round of the 2006 NFL Draft. On September 11, 2007, Simpson was placed on injured reserve.

Detroit Lions
Simpson was traded to the Detroit Lions for a seventh round pick on September 4, 2009. On November 25, Simpson was placed on injured reserve with a torn patella with a separated MCL.

He was released by the Lions on September 4, 2010.

NFL statistics

Personal life
On January 1, 2009 Simpson was arrested by a Rock Hill, South Carolina police officer for hindering police while they were attempting to break up an unruly crowd. According to the police report, Simpson verbally abused officers.

References

1983 births
Living people
People from Rock Hill, South Carolina
Players of American football from South Carolina
American football safeties
African-American players of American football
South Carolina Gamecocks football players
Buffalo Bills players
Detroit Lions players
Rock Hill High School (South Carolina) alumni
21st-century African-American sportspeople
20th-century African-American people